Tun Datuk Abang Haji Openg bin Abang Sapiee (7 October 1905 – 28 March 1969) was a Malaysian politician who served as the first Yang di-Pertua Negeri of Sarawak from September 1963 to his death in March 1969. He assumed the newly established post following Sarawak's independence from the Great Britain and the formation of Malaysia in 1963.

Early life and career 
Abang Openg was born on 7 October 1905 during the White Rajahs of Brooke dynasty's rule. He had his early education in Kuching before moving to Sarikei with his father Abang Sapiee. Abang Openg attended St. Anthony School in Sarikei before returning to Kuching to continue his education at St. Thomas School.

As a 19-year-old man of the descendants of the elite with title Abang, Abang Openg chose to enter the Brooke administration as a clerk in 1924. He was elevated to senior officer of native affairs in Sarikei after serving for eight years. He was appointed third-class magistrate in 1937.

White Rajah Charles Vyner Brooke gave Abang Openg a special appointment, and he was afterwards appointed to a member of the state council. He was elevated to second-class magistrate and Kuching Division native affairs first officer in early 1941, just before World War II.

Abang Openg held the principle of choosing to be loyal to the Brooke rule until the Japanese surrender in September 1945. When Vyner decided to cede Sarawak to Britain, Abang Openg and several other Brooke officials opposed the decision.

Honours

Honours of Malaysia 
  :
 Grand Commander of the Order of the Defender of the Realm (SMN) – Tun (1964)

:
 Knight Commander of the Most Exalted Order of the Star of Sarawak (PNBS) – Dato' (1953)

Foreign honour 
:
 Officer of the Order of the British Empire (OBE) (1962)

Namesakes 
Several places were named after Abang Openg, including:

 SMK Tun Abang Haji Openg, a secondary school in Kuching
 Jalan Tun Abang Haji Openg in Kuching
 Jalan Tun Abang Haji Openg in Sibu
 Jalan Tun Openg in Tanjung Kidurong, Bintulu
 Jalan Abang Haji Openg in Taman Tun Dr Ismail, Kuala Lumpur

References

Malaysian Muslims
Grand Commanders of the Order of the Defender of the Realm
Recipients of the Order of the Star of Sarawak
1905 births
Malaysian people of Malay descent
1969 deaths
Yang di-Pertua Negeri of Sarawak
People from Kuching